Streda nad Bodrogom is a village in Slovakia near Trebišov in the Košice Region.

The village has the lowest altitude ( above sea level) in Slovakia.

The village is an important archeological site (findings from the Mesolithic, Neolithic, Eneolithic, Bronze Age, grave-mounds from the late 1st century BC, Slavic finds from the 7th and 8th century and early Magyar graves).

The first written mention of the village dates back to 1320. An old castle near the village was destroyed by imperial (Austrian) troops in 1670.

In 2001, it had a population of 2,459, of whom 1,476 were ethnic Hungarians (60.02%), 896 Slovak (36.43%) and 87 (3.53%) other, mainly Romani.

Villages and municipalities in Trebišov District
Zemplín (region)